Dr. Samuel Maduka Onyishi was born in Nsukka, Enugu State, in November 1963 and is considered a successful business mogul of the Enugu Northern extraction. owing to the loss of his father in his first year in secondary school, an incidence that forced him to assume the role of pseudo breadwinner to his family consisting of his widowed mother and siblings. Dr. Sam Onyishi, as he is mostly called, attended the Enugu Road Primary School, Nsukka from 1971 to 1976 then was admitted into Bubendorf Grammar School, Adazi, in the present day Anambra State. He contemplated tearing his certificate, since education seemed to mean nothing then given his reality. But an encounter with a kinsman who was 2 years below him in primary school a few years later would make him change his view about education, he returned to school later in life. He got admission to do a Diploma Program at University of Nigeria, Nsukka, between 1993 – 1996 and later, a degree program from 1996 – 1999. He graduated with a Second Class Upper in Social works and Community development. He later got a Masters in Business Administration (MBA) in Entrepreneurship from the Institute for Transformative Thought and Learning in the Doctoral Research Centre of the University of Arizona, Phoenix, in the United States.

Career 
It was within the period of his university education that, in 1994, the Founder of Peace Group of companies, started his transportation business with 2 buses which has now grown to about 4,000 fleet of vehicles.

In 2019 May & Baker Nigeria Plc has appointed Dr. Samuel Maduka Onyishi as its new Non-Executive Director. He was appointed during the company's 2019 Annual General Meeting (AGM). Sequel to the appointment, he has also been recommended by May & Baker's board for election as a Director of the company.

On 4 January 2020, Governor Ifeanyi Ugwuanyi laid the foundation for entrepreneurial university, Samuel Maduka University, Agu-Ekwegbe in Igbo Etiti Local Government Area of Enugu State founded by the Chief executive officer of Peace Mass Transit (PMT) Company, Dr. Samuel Onyishi.

On 7 January 2021, He took over Actis's share in C&I Leasing through his company Peace Mass Transit to own majority stock worth about 55.82% of the company's shares.

Charity 
As part of his commitment to community development or what some have attributed to his Corporate social responsibility (CSR) to the community of his birth, in 2018, he sponsored the constructing of 1.6 km road in his home town, Amaukwa, Nsukka, not far from the University of Nigeria, Nsukka. the commissioning of the road was attended by the Executive Governor of the State, Hon.Ifeanyi Ugwuanyi, and the then Vice Chancellor of the University of Nigeria, Nsukka, Professor Benjamin Chukwuma Ozumba.

He is the founder of the Samuel Maduka Onyishi African Entrepreneurship Foundation (SAMOAEF), a foundation which among others, gives scholarship annually to more than 150 students from different institutions in Nigeria.

Awards 
In 2019, he received an award from the Chinese Alumni Association of Nigeria, as an 'Outstanding Nigerian Advocate on China/Nigeria Relations'. The Alumni recognition was part of the 1st October Awards, for the 70th anniversary of the People's Republic of China, and Nigeria's 59th Independence anniversary.

On November 10, 2019, Dr Sam Onyishi received the 2019 Prestigious Business Integrity Award by Business Hallmark

He earned an honorary Doctor of Business Administration in May 2013, from the Enugu State University of Science and Technology. His Alma Mata, University of Nigeria, Nsukka also awarded him an honorary Doctor of Business Administration

On September 17, 2012, the President Goodluck Jonathan led government honoured him and 154 others with the award of Member of the Order of the Niger (MON)

References  

Living people
Enugu State
Nigerian businesspeople
Transport companies of Nigeria
Nigerian philanthropists
Year of birth missing (living people)